Heathcote County was one of the former counties of New Zealand. It covered the southern parts of Christchurch.

History
Heathcote County was preceded by the Heathcote Road Board, which had its first meeting on 27 January 1864. An 1863 ordinance from the Canterbury Provincial Council established three road boards along the Heathcote River: East, Central, and South Heathcote. The Roads Ordinance was amended in 1864, and East Heathcote became the Heathcote Road Board, Central Heathcote became the Spreydon Road Board, and South Heathcote became the Halswell Road Board.

Heathcote became a county in 1911. The county was abolished through the 1989 local government reforms.

Chairmen

Road Board
The Road Board had 19 chairmen between 1864 and 1911.

County Council
The County Council had 16 chairmen between 1911 and 1989. The last chairman of the Road Board became the first chairman of the County Council.

Table footnotes:

See also 
 List of former territorial authorities in New Zealand § Counties
 List of counties of New Zealand

Notes

References

Counties of New Zealand
Politics of Christchurch